Cruel Intentions is the debut extended play (EP) by Canadian rapper Tory Lanez and electronic music label WeDidIt Records; it was released on June 26, 2015. All producers on the album are on the label except Play Picasso, who is signed to Tory Lanez independent record label, One Umbrella. Lanez collaborated with RL Grime, Baauer, D33J and Shlohmo who are artists signed to WeDidIt Records. The album was supported by two singles, "In For It" and "Acting Like".

Singles
On April 3, 2015, the first promotional single, titled "In For It", was released. According to the cover art the song was recorded in Los Angeles. On May 22, 2015, the second promotional single, titled "Acting Like", was released. The music video was released on the same day.

Track listing

References

2015 debut EPs
Albums produced by D33J
Tory Lanez albums